The Family Doctor and People's Medical Adviser was published on 7 March 1885 by George Purkess of 286, Strand. The magazine was headquartered in London.

The magazine is known for the readers' letters about sexual fetishism.

Sources

The Regime of the Stay-Lace, pp. 51ff. 
The Corset; A Cultural History, pp. 93ff. 

Weekly magazines published in the United Kingdom
Defunct magazines published in the United Kingdom
Magazines published in London
Magazines established in 1885
Magazines with year of disestablishment missing
Sexual fetishism
Health magazines